This is a list of international treaties the United States has either not signed, not ratified, or signed/ratified but later withdrawn its signature/ratification from.

Background 

The Treaty Clause in Article Two of the United States Constitution dictates that the President of the United States negotiates treaties with other countries or political entities, and signs them. Signed treaties enter into force only if ratified by at least two-thirds (67 members) of the United States Senate. (Technically, the Senate itself does not ratify treaties, it only approves or rejects resolutions of ratification submitted by the Committee on Foreign Relations; if approved, the United States exchanges the instruments of ratification with the foreign power(s)). Between 1789 and 1990, the Senate approved more than 1,500 treaties, rejected 21, and 85 treaties were withdrawn because the Senate did not act on them. As of December 2014, 36 treaties signed by the President were awaiting action by the Senate.

Among the treaties unsigned or unratified by the United States, a few have been singled out by organizations such as Human Rights Watch (2009), as extremely important, and the United States’ reluctance to ratify them problematic. Among the treaties are the Convention on the Elimination of All Forms of Discrimination against Women (CEDAW), the Convention on the Rights of the Child (CRC), the International Convention for the Protection of All Persons from Enforced Disappearance (ICPPED), the Ottawa Treaty (Mine Ban Treaty), the Convention on Cluster Munitions (CCM), the Convention on the Rights of Persons with Disabilities, and the Optional Protocol to the Convention against Torture (OPCAT). The United States is also one of the few countries not to have ratified the Kyoto Protocol.  According to a 2014 analysis by The New Republic, the ratification of a significant number of treaties signed after 1990 has been blocked by senators of the Republican Party for various ideological reasons.

List

See also 
List of United States treaties
Foreign policy of the United States

References

External links 
Ratification of International Human Rights Treaties - USA

United States, unsigned